James Arthur Bond is a New Zealand former rugby league footballer who represented New Zealand fourteen times, including captaining the side in the 1968 World Cup.

Playing career
Bond played for the Papanui club in the Canterbury Rugby League competition and represented both Canterbury and the South Island. He first made the New Zealand national rugby league team in 1961 when he was part of the tour of Great Britain and France. Bond was a continual selection for the Kiwis until 1964. After that year he was not selected again until the 1968 season.

In 1968 Bond was selected to captain the side to the 1968 World Cup.

Coaching career
After retirement Bond coached the University club in the Canterbury Rugby League competition.

References

Living people
New Zealand rugby league players
New Zealand national rugby league team players
Canterbury rugby league team players
Papanui Tigers players
South Island rugby league team players
New Zealand national rugby league team captains
Rugby league five-eighths
New Zealand rugby league coaches
Year of birth missing (living people)